Deputy of Staff of the Army (DoSA) has been the title of the second in command of the Sri Lanka Army created in 1994. The post is held by a regular officer of the rank of Major General and is the third senior position in the army. Deputy of Staff is charged with assisting the Chief of Staff of the Army in both operational and administrative aspects, functioning as the Acting Army Commander in his absences or incantation.  Major General Sujeewa Senerath Yapa is Current Deputy Chief of Staff of the Army.

List of Deputy Chief of Staff

References

External links 

 Sri Lanka Army

Sri Lanka Army appointments
Lists of Sri Lankan military personnel